Ureibacillus terrenus is a species of bacteria with type species TH9AT (= DSM 12654T = LMG 19470T).

References

Further reading

External links
LPSN

Type strain of Ureibacillus terrenus at BacDive -  the Bacterial Diversity Metadatabase

Bacillales
Bacteria described in 2001